Yuki Oya (大矢 勇気, Ōya Yūki, born 20 November 1981) is a Japanese Paralympic athlete. He won the silver medal in the men's 100 metres T52 event at the 2020 Summer Paralympics held in Tokyo, Japan.

In 2019, he finished in 4th place in the men's 100 metres T52 event at the World Para Athletics Championships held in Dubai, United Arab Emirates.

References

External links
 

Living people
1981 births
Paralympic medalists in athletics (track and field)
Athletes (track and field) at the 2020 Summer Paralympics
Medalists at the 2020 Summer Paralympics
Paralympic silver medalists for Japan
Paralympic athletes of Japan
People from Nishinomiya